Sami Mohamed Wafa  is a retired naturalised Qatari footballer who played as a goalkeeper for the Qatar national team in the 1984 Asian Cup. He also played for Al Sadd at club level.

His daughter, Nada Arkaji, is a swimmer who represented Qatar at the 2012 Summer Olympics.

References

External links
Stats

Year of birth missing (living people)
Living people
Qatari footballers
Al Sadd SC players
Qatar Stars League players
Qatar international footballers
1984 AFC Asian Cup players
Naturalised citizens of Qatar
Association football goalkeepers